Yana Chuku (Quechua yana black, chuku hat, "black hat", Hispanicized spelling Yanachuco) is a  mountain in the Andes of Peru. It lies in the Huancavelica Region, Angaraes Province, Lircay District, and in the Huancavelica Province, Huachocolpa District.

References

Mountains of Huancavelica Region
Mountains of Peru